Religion in Sweden has, over the years, become increasingly diverse. Christianity was the religion of virtually all of the Swedish population from the 12th to the early 20th century, but it has rapidly declined throughout the late 20th and early 21st century.

Christianity came to Sweden as early as the 9th century mainly as a result of an expansion in trade. The ancient Nordic religions were slowly replaced. Several centuries later all monarchs were Christian and Christianity became the established official religion. The church belonged to the Catholic Church until 1527 when the Swedish state church was established as a Protestant church based on Lutheran principles, following the Protestant Reformation enacted by Martin Luther which converted most of Germanic Europe. The Lutheran Church of Sweden was formed and remained the official religion of the Christian state until the turn of the 21st century.

In recent years, the Swedish religious landscape has become increasingly diverse, with Christians comprising in 2020 some 61.3% (of which 55.2% belonging to the Church of Sweden) of the total population and rising numbers of people of other religions and people who do not belong to any church (34.8%). The Lutheran Church of Sweden – which was the state religion until 2000 – is by far the largest Christian denomination but is facing a continuous decline in registered membership down to 53,9 % of the total population in 2021 Other minor Christian denominations include Free churches, the Catholic Church and Eastern Orthodox Churches, while members of other religions are mostly Muslims, Buddhists, Hindus and Jews.

History

Historical Norse religion

Before the 11th century, Swedes practised Norse religion, worshipping a variety of Germanic deities. An important religious centre was the Temple at Uppsala. The shape and location of this temple is sparsely documented, but it is referenced in the Norse sagas and Saxo Grammaticus' Gesta Danorum, and is also described by Adam of Bremen. It was probably destroyed by King Ingold I in 1087 during the last known battle between the pagans and the Christians.

While Norse religion was officially abandoned with the Christianization of Scandinavia, belief in many spirits of Norse mythology such as tomtar, trolls, elves and dwarves lived on for a long time in Scandinavian folklore.

9th–12th century: Conversion to Catholicism

The oldest evidence of Christian burial sites in Sweden are dated to the 6th century, but they are very few in number. The earliest documented campaign to Christianise the Swedes was made by the monk Ansgar (801–865). Making his first visit to Birka in 828–829, he was granted permission to build a church. In 831, he returned home and became Archbishop of Hamburg-Bremen, with responsibility for Christianity in the north. Around 850, he came back to Birka, where the original congregation had been shattered. Ansgar tried to reestablish it, but it only lasted a few years.

Christianity first gained a hold in Västergötland, probably due to mercantile ties to the Christian Anglo-Saxon kingdoms in England. Remnants of a 9th-century church building has recently been excavated in Varnhem. The diocese of Skara, which is the oldest diocese in Sweden, emerged under the Archdiocese of Hamburg-Bremen, in the late 10th century. According to Adam of Bremen, the Christian king Olof Skötkonung, who ruled from c. 995 to c. 1022 was forced to limit Christian activities to the western province. When King Stenkil ascended to the throne in 1060 Christianity was firmly established throughout most of Sweden, although the people of Uppland, and probably Sodermanland, resisted the new religion.

The last king adhering to the old religion was Blot-Sweyn, who reigned 1084–1087. A handful of local saints (canonized on diocesan level before the centralized process became normative in 1170–1200), folk saints and clerics were allegedly martyred as late as the 1120s, most of them in Sodermanland and Uppland. Under the reign of Eric the Saint (1150–1160) Christianity became an ideological factor of the state, and the First Swedish Crusade took place; it was a military expedition aimed at converting the Finns to Christianity and conquering Finland as Swedish territory. (However, no archeological data or written sources seem to support the legend. The diocese and bishop of Finland are not listed among their Swedish counterparts before the 1250s). A national church of Sweden was not organized until 1164, when the first archbishop of Uppsala received his pallium from the archbishop of Lund.

Pre-Reformation Swedish Catholic religious leaders – including Bridget of Sweden, founder of the continuously functioning Catholic Vadstena Abbey – continue to be held in high regard by the population as a whole. Her nunnery at Vadstena is one of Sweden's pre-eminent tourist attractions.

16th century: Protestant Reformation; conversion to Lutheranism

Shortly after Gustav Vasa was elected king in 1523, he asked the Pope to confirm Johannes Magnus as Archbishop of Sweden, replacing Gustav Trolle, who had supported the Danish king Christian II and was convicted for treason. When the Pope refused, Gustav Vasa – he himself a proponent of a "Renaissance Biblical Humanism" – started to promote the Swedish Lutheran reformers Olaus, Laurentius Petri, and Laurentius Andreae. Gustav Trolle was eventually forced into exile, and soon all ecclesiastical property was transferred to the Crown. In 1531, Laurentius Petri was appointed by the Crown to become the first Lutheran primate of Sweden, and was ordained by five Catholic bishops without papal assent. The ties with Rome were irreversibly cut in 1536, when Canon Law was abolished.

Originally, no changes were made to official church doctrine, and the episcopal organization was retained. Gradually, in spite of popular protests against the introduction of "Luthery", teachings were aligned with continental Lutheranism. Calvinism was, otherwise, refuted as heresy at the synod of Stockholm in 1565. In order to appease the Holy See, king John III of Sweden, one of Gustav Vasa's sons, took measures to bring the Church of Sweden to a theological position influenced by George Cassander, but, in the heat of controversy, such a compromise position did not achieve its intent of reunion. However, after his death, his brother, Duke Charles, summoned the Uppsala Synod in 1593, which declared the Holy Scriptures the sole guideline for faith, with four documents accepted as faithful and authoritative explanations of it: the Apostles' Creed, the Nicene Creed, the Athanasian Creed, and the unaltered Augsburg Confession of 1530. The Uppsala Synod also reinstated The Swedish Church Ordinance of 1572, which remained in use until 1686.

The move put Charles at odds with the heir to the throne, his nephew Sigismund, who was raised in the Catholic faith. Although Sigismund promised to uphold Lutheranism, Duke Charles's aspirations to power led to the War against Sigismund, a power struggle that was effectively decided at the Battle of Stångebro in 1598, in favour of Charles and Protestantism.

During the era following the Protestant Reformation, usually known as the period of Lutheran Orthodoxy, small groups of non-Lutherans, especially Calvinist Dutchmen, the Moravian Church and Walloon immigrants from the Southern Netherlands, played a significant role in trade and industry, and were quietly tolerated as long as they kept a low profile.

17th–18th century: Conversion of the Sami, freedom for Christian minorities and Jews
The Sami, who originally had their own shamanistic religion, were converted to Lutheranism by Swedish missionaries in the 17th and 18th centuries. Citizens of foreign nations, mainly Russians, were granted freedom to practice Eastern Orthodox Christianity since the Treaty of Stolbovo in 1617. Anglican and Calvinist foreigners were granted freedom to practice their religions in Stockholm (1741) and Gothenburg (1747). Similar liberties were granted Catholics in 1781, and an apostolic vicar was sent to Sweden in 1783. In 1782, with the passage of Judereglementet, Jews were allowed to settle in three cities and practice their religion, although they were not allowed to proselytize or marry Christians.

18th–19th century: Crackdown on Pietism and enforcement of Lutheranism
In order to curb Pietism, several royal decrees and parliament acts were issued in the 18th century, such as the Conventicle Act and Kyrkogångsplikt . They forbade Swedish citizens to engage in practices other than mandatory Lutheran Sunday Mass and daily family devotions. Without the presence of a Lutheran clergyman, public religious gatherings were forbidden. It remained illegal until 1860 for Lutheran Swedes to convert to another confession or religion.

19th–20th century: Liberalisation of all religions
In 1860 it became legal to leave the Church of Sweden for the purpose of becoming a member of another officially recognised religious denomination. From 1951, it became legal to leave the church, without providing any reason. From 1951 to 1977 all religious institutions could only be established with the permission of the Crown.

Demographics

{| class="wikitable sortable" style="float:left; margin:1em;"
!Religion, formal affiliation (in 2020)
!Members
!Percent
|-
! style="text-align:left" |Christianity
! style="text-align:left" |6,364,093
! style="text-align:left" |61.3%
|-
|Church of Sweden
|5,728,746
|55.2%
|-
|Eastern Christian Churches
|149,364
|1.4%
|-
|Catholic Church|125,287
|1.2%
|-
|Uniting Church in Sweden|112,460
|1.1%
|-
|Pentecostal congregations|114,953
|1.1%
|-
|Evangelical Free Church
|44,674
|0.43%
|-
|Swedish Evangelical Mission|44,147
|0.43%
|-
|Jehovah's Witnesses
|22,199
|0.21%
|-
|Swedish Alliance Mission|18,028
|0.17%
|-
|Other Christians|26,434
|0.25%
|-
! style="text-align:left" |Non-Christian religions
! style="text-align:left" |275,947
! style="text-align:left" |2.7%
|-
|Islam
|241,933
|2.3%
|-
|Buddhism
|12,328
|0.1%
|-
|Mandaeism
|13,012
|0.13%
|-
|Judaism
|8,148
|0.08%
|-
|Alevism
|4,565
|0.04%
|-
! style="text-align:left" |No affiliation or other religions
! style="text-align:left" |3,739,255
! style="text-align:left" |36.0%
|-
! style="text-align:left" |Total
! style="text-align:left" |10,379,295
! style="text-align:left" |100.0%
|}

The constitution of Sweden provides for freedom of religion, and the government generally respects this right in practice. The government at all levels seeks to protect this right in full and does not tolerate its abuse, either by governmental or private actors. The rights and freedoms enumerated in the constitution include the rights to practice one's religion and protection of religious freedom. The laws concerning religious freedoms are generally observed and enforced at all government levels and by the courts in a non-discriminatory fashion. Legal protections cover discrimination or persecution by private actors.

In the early 2000s about 80% of Swedes belonged to the Church of Sweden. By the end of 2020, this figure had fallen to 55.2%. Other religious organizations keep count of their registered membership, and as reported in the table, as of 2020 the largest religious denominations after the Church of Sweden (55.2%) were the officially registered Muslims (2.3%), members of the Orthodox Church (1.4%), Catholics (1.2%) and members of the Swedish Pentecostal Movement (1.1%).

Eight recognized religious denominations, in addition to the Church of Sweden, raise revenues through member-contributions made through the national tax system. All recognized denominations are entitled to direct government financial support, contributions made through the national tax system, or a mix of both. Certain Christian holidays are national holidays. School students from minority religious backgrounds are entitled to take relevant religious holidays. No recognition or registration is required to carry out religious activity. Religious groups that want to receive government aid may apply for it.

Education about all major world religions is compulsory in public schools. Parents may send their children to religious charter schools, all of which receive school vouchers, provided they adhere to government guidelines on core academic curriculum. The Office of the Ombudsman against Ethnic Discrimination investigates claims of discrimination "due to race, skin color, national or ethnic origin, or religion". Discrimination on religious grounds is illegal, including discrimination in the work place and in the provision of public and private services.

 Surveys 
In 2017, the Pew Research Center found in their Global Attitudes Survey that 59.9% of the Swedes regarded themselves as Christians, with 48.7% belonging to the Church of Sweden, 9.5% were Unaffiliated Christians, 0.7% were Pentecostal Protestants, 0.4% were Catholics, the Eastern Orthodox and the Congregationalist were the 0.3% each. Unaffiliated people were the 35.0% divided in 18.8% Atheists, 11.9% nothing in particular and 4.3% Agnostics. Muslims were the 2.2% and members of other religions were the 2.5%.

In 2016 the International Social Survey Programme found that 70.2% of the Swedish population declared belonging to a Christian denomination, with the Church of Sweden being the largest church, accounting for the 65.8% of respondents; the Free Church was the second-largest church accounting for 2.8%, Roman Catholics were 0.7% and Eastern Orthodox were 0.5%; members of other Christian denominations comprised 0.4% of the total population. A further 28.5% declared no religion, 1.1% identified as Muslim and 0.3% declared belonging to other religions.

In 2015 the Eurobarometer found that Christianity was the religion of 47.6% of respondents, with Protestantism being the main denomination with 36.5%, followed by other Christians with 8.6%, Catholics with 1.6% and Eastern Orthodox with 0.8%. 31.0% of the sample identified as agnostic and 19.0% identified as atheist.

 Christianity 

In 2020 there were 6,364,093 formally affiliated Christians in Sweden, comprising 61.3% of the total population.

A survey by the Pew Research Center found in spring 2016 that 66.7% out of a sample of 1,000 Swedes claimed to be Christians.

As of 2016, 6,484,203 people, or 64.9% of the total population, were registered members of the various Protestant denominations in Sweden.

 Church of Sweden 

Representing about half of the population, the Church of Sweden is the largest Christian church in Sweden, and also the largest religious body. The church professes the Lutheran faith and is a member of the Porvoo Communion. As of 2021 it had 5,633,867 members, 53,9 % of the Swedish population, although surveys show different figures, ranging from 24% to 52.1%. to 67.3%. Until 2000 it held the position of state religion, and most Swedes were baptised at birth, until 1996 all newborns with at least one parent being a member of the Church of Sweden were also registered as members of the church. Yet the membership is declining rapidly, about 1% each year, for the most recent years even 2%, falling from 95% in 1972 and 82% in 2000. The number of both new baptisms and members has declined since. Indeed, according to official statistics, as of 2021:

 About 1 out of 3 (35.2%) children are christened in the Church of Sweden.
 About 1 out of 4 (23.5%) weddings take place in church.
 About 2 out of 3 (66.8%) Swedes have Christian burials.

The Church of Sweden, by law, is organized in the following manner:
It is an Evangelical Lutheran community of faith manifested in parishes and dioceses. The church also has a national organisation.
It is an open national church which, working with a democratic organisation and through the ministry of the church, covers the whole nation.
The primate of the Church of Sweden is the Archbishop of Uppsala.

 Other Protestant denominations 
The 19th century saw the arrival of various evangelical free churches, and, towards the end of the century secularism, leading many to distance themselves from church rituals. Leaving the Church of Sweden became legal with the so-called Dissenter Act of 1860, but only under the provision of entering another denomination. The right to not belong to any religious denomination was established in the law on freedom of religion in 1951.

Today, the Swedish Free Church Council organizes free churches in Sweden, belonging to various Protestant denominations: Calvinist, Pentecostal, and others. In total the member churches have around 250,000 members. Baptists, Methodists and the Mission Covenant Church of Sweden merged in 2011 into a new denomination: the Uniting Church in Sweden. It is the largest member church in the Swedish Free Church Council, with approximately 65,000 members. One of the Baptist denominations, the Evangelical Free Church in Sweden, has remained an independent denomination outside this merger.

 Catholic Church 

Most Catholics in Sweden are of Slavic (especially Poles and Croats), South American or Middle Eastern (especially Assyrian) origin.

As of 2020, legally registered Catholics in Sweden were 125,287, comprising 1.2% of the total population, the same percentage was found in a spring 2016 survey in Sweden.

 Orthodox Christianity 
Multiple Orthodox jurisdictions exist in Sweden, including but not limited to the Greek and Serbian Orthodox Churches. There is also a substantial presence of Assyrians, Coptic and Ethiopian Orthodox Christians. The Serbian Orthodox Church has several parishes in Sweden, under jurisdiction of Serbian Orthodox Eparchy of Britain and Scandinavia. The Church of the Goths has a presence in Gotland though it is not currently recognized by any other Orthodox jurisdictions. As of 2020, legally registered Eastern Orthodox Christians were 149,364 and they were the second-largest Christian denomination in Sweden, comprising 1.4% of the total population.

 Restorationist 

Jehovah's Witnesses
According to the 2015 Yearbook of Jehovah's Witnesses, there are 22,730 active members in Sweden, and 36,270 people attended their annual memorial of Christ's death. This number includes active members and guests.

The Church of Jesus Christ of Latter-day Saints
The Church of Jesus Christ of Latter-Day Saints claims 9,528 members in 40 congregations in Sweden as of 2022.

Other Abrahamic religions 

Bahá'í Faith

The Bahá'ís claim about 1,000 Bahá'ís and 25 local assemblies in Sweden from Umeå in the north to Malmö in the south. In November 2009 the Swedish paper Västerbottens-Kuriren reported that 25 local non-profit Bahá'í organization had changed their organizational form to religious communions. The central Bahá'í secretariat in Stockholm stated at the time that the Bahá'i Faith in Sweden had 1003 members. The Association of Religion Data Archives (relying on World Christian Encyclopedia) estimated some 6,200 Bahá'ís in 2005.

Islam

Islam entered Sweden primarily through immigration from countries with large Muslim populations (such as Albania, Bosnia and Herzegovina, Turkey, Iraq, Morocco, Iran, Kosovo and Somalia) in the late 20th century. The Baltic Tatars were the first Muslim group in modern Sweden.

In 2009, the U.S. Department of State estimated that there were 450,000 to 500,000 Muslims in Sweden, around 5% of the total population. Sweden's official statistics counted 241,933 formally affiliated Muslims in 2020. The US Department of State's Sweden 2014 International Religious Freedom Report set the 2014 figure at around 6% (almost 600,000) of the total Swedish population.

Judaism

The Official Council of Swedish Jewish Communities estimates about 20,000 ethnic Jews in Sweden by halakhic criteria. Of them, about 8,148 were members of a Jewish religious congregation in 2020.

Stockholm has the largest community and boasts a primary school, a kindergarten, a library, a bi-monthly publication (Judisk Krönika) and a weekly Jewish radio program. Other cities like Malmö, Gothenburg, Borås, Helsingborg, Lund, and Uppsala have Jewish communities as well. Synagogues can be found in Stockholm (which has two Orthodox and one Conservative synagogue), Göteborg (one Orthodox and one Conservative synagogue), Malmö (one Orthodox synagogue), and in Norrköping (although the Norrköping community is too small to perform regular services).

 Dharmic religions 

Buddhism

In 2020, there were 12,328 formal affiliated Buddhists in Sweden, comprising 0.1% of the total population.

Hinduism

The 2005 International Religious Freedom Report'' states that there are between 7,000 and 10,000 Hindus.

Germanic Heathenism

Germanic Heathenry, the contemporary continuation of ancient Germanic religion, is represented by various organizations, including the Nordic Asa-Community, the Swedish Forn Sed Assembly and the Community for Nordic Faith. Founded in 2014, the Nordic Asa-Community has quickly grown to become the largest Heathen organization in Sweden, despite being the most recently established among the three.

See also
Christianization of Scandinavia
Bahá'í Faith in Sweden
Buddhism in Sweden
Hinduism in Sweden
Religion in Europe
Religion by country
Demographics of atheism
Irreligion in Sweden
Sámi shamanism

References

External links 

Eurel: sociological and legal data on religions in Europe